-ary may refer to:
 The arity of a function, operation, or relation
 -ary associativity, a specific rule attached to -ary functions
 -ary group, a generalization of group
 The radix of a numerical representation system
 The number of letters in an alphabet (formal languages) 
 An -ary code
 An -ary Gray code
 An -ary Huffman code
  An -ary tree

See also 
 n- (disambiguation)#Mathematics, science and technology
 Unary (disambiguation)
 Binary (disambiguation)
 Ternary (disambiguation)